Chilobrachys jonitriantisvansickleae is a species of tarantula of the genus Chilobrachys. It is endemic to Sri Lanka. The species is named for Joni Triantis Van Sickle, a conservationist involved in protecting the area. It is characterized by iridescent blue markings on its legs.

Taxonomy
The specific name was spelt jonitriantisvansicklei by the original describers. However, this is the correct ending only when the person it is named after is a man; Joni Triantis Van Sickle is a woman. As per Article 32.5.1 of the International Code of Zoological Nomenclature, the World Spider Catalog has corrected the name to have the feminine genitive ending jonitriantisvansickleae.

See also 
 List of Theraphosidae species

References

Theraphosidae
Spiders of Asia
Endemic fauna of Sri Lanka
Spiders described in 2019